The 1917 Delaware Fightin' Blue Hens football team was an American football team that represented Delaware College (later renamed the University of Delaware) as an independent during the 1917 college football season. In its first and only season under head coach Stan Baumgartner, the team compiled a 2–5 record and was outscored by a total of 108 to 20. Ernest S. Wilson was the team captain. The team played its home games at Frazer Field in Newark, Delaware.

Schedule

References

Delaware
Delaware Fightin' Blue Hens football seasons
Delaware Fightin' Blue Hens football